1-deoxy-11beta-hydroxypentalenate dehydrogenase (1-deoxy-11beta-hydroxypentalenic acid dehydrogenase,  (gene),  (gene name)) is an enzyme with systematic name 1-deoxy-11beta-hydroxypentalenate:NAD+ oxidoreductase. This enzyme catalyses the following chemical reaction

 1-deoxy-11beta-hydroxypentalenate + NAD+  1-deoxy-11-oxopentalenate + NADH + H+

This enzyme from the bacterium Streptomyces avermitilis participates in pentalenolactone biosynthesis.

References

External links 
 

EC 1.1.1